Este (Spanish for East), also known as District 2 and Málaga-Este, is one of the 11 districts of the city of Málaga, Spain.

Barrios
It comprises de following wards (barrios):
 
 Baños del Carmen
 Bellavista
 Camino de Olías
 Castillo de Santa Catalina
 Cerrado de Calderón
 Colinas del Limonar
 Echeverría del Palo
 El Candado
 El Chanquete
 El Drago
 El Lagarillo
 El Limonar
 El Mayorazgo
 El Morlaco
 El Palo
 El Polvorín
 El Rocío
 Fábrica de Cemento
 Finca Clavero
 Finca El Candado
 Hacienda Clavero
 Hacienda Miramar
 Hacienda Paredes
 Jarazmín
 La Araña
 La Caleta
 La Malagueta
 La Mosca
 La Pelusa
 La Pelusilla
 La Torrecilla
 La Vaguada
 La Viña
 Las Acacias
 Las Cuevas
 Las Niñas
 Las Palmeras
 Lomas de San Antón
 Los Pinos del Limonar
 Miraflores
 Miraflores Alto
 Miraflores del Palo
 Miramar
 Monte Sancha
 Olías
 Parque Clavero
 Parque del Morlaco
 Pedregalejo
 Pedregalejo Playa
 Peinado Grande
 Pinares de San Antón
 Playa Virginia
 Playas del Palo
 Podadera
 San Francisco
 San Isidro
 Santa Paula Miramar
 Torre de San Telmo
 Valle de los Galanes
 Villa Cristina
 Virgen de las Angustias

References

External links
 Málaga Council official website
 Aerial pictures of Málaga-Este

Districts of Málaga